Albert Bailey "Allie" Watt (December 12, 1899 – March 15, 1968) was a Major League Baseball player who played in  with the Washington Senators. Watt was the brother of former Major Leaguer, Frank Watt.

He was born in Philadelphia, and died in Norfolk, Virginia.

With a double in his only turn at-bat, Watt is one of the rare Major Leaguers with a career batting average of 1.000.

Watt is doubly notable because he is one of the few real players whose name is in the correct position in the famous Who's on First? comedy routine (Watt played second base).

External links

1899 births
1968 deaths
Baseball players from Pennsylvania
Washington Senators (1901–1960) players
Major League Baseball second basemen
Columbia Comers players
Mobile Sea Gulls players
Newark Bears (IL) players
Newport News Shipbuilders players
Norfolk Tars players
Portsmouth Truckers players
Raleigh Capitals players
Reading Keystones players
Shreveport Gassers players
York White Roses players